Mr. Sketch is a brand of scented markers, currently owned by Newell Brands. Its markers are sold in packages of 4, 6, 8, 10, 12 and 18 and 22 units. Mr. Sketch markers come in both chisel and fine point. The markers have large strokes and can be used for posters and group work. Mr. Sketch markers have many different colors to choose from. 

Mr. Sketch markers were originally introduced by the Sanford Manufacturing Co. in 1965, and have been popular with small children.

Colors and fragrances

4 set

12 set (*additional colors)

18 set (*additional colors)

6 set (Ice Cream)

6 set (movie night; *additional colors)

6 set (intergalactic; *additional neon colors)

6 set (holiday)

Note
On the 18 pack of Mr. Sketch crayons, there are 2 flavors (with additional colors that haven't been remained on the markers):

References

External links
 

Pens